James Brown F. Herreshoff (1834–1930) was an American inventor and chemist with a number of American patents related to chemicals and filed in the 1900s and 1910s: a coil-stream boiler, keels used on racing yachts, sliding seats on rowboats, mercurial anti-fouling paint, an apparatus for measuring heat of gases.

Biography 
James Brown Herreshoff was born in Bristol, Rhode Island on March 18, 1834, into a notable American family of chemists, boat designers and inventors. He graduated from Brown University.

He died in Riverdale, New York on December 5, 1930.

Family 
Herreshoff was the father of Charlies Frederick Herreshoff II (1876–1954), yacht designer, automotive designer, and automotive manufacturer. By way of his mother, Julia Ann Lewis (1811–1901), he was a grand nephew of Captain Winslow Lewis (1770–1850), sea captain, engineer, inventor, and contractor active in the construction of many American lighthouses during the first half of the nineteenth century.

References 

1834 births
1930 deaths
20th-century American inventors
American chemists
Brown University alumni
Herreshoff family